Brien Anderson Best (born ) is a Barbadian male weightlifter, competing in the 77 kg category and representing Barbados at international competitions. He participated at the 2014 Commonwealth Games in the 77 kg event.

Major competitions

References

1996 births
Living people
Barbadian male weightlifters
Place of birth missing (living people)
Weightlifters at the 2014 Commonwealth Games
Commonwealth Games competitors for Barbados
Weightlifters at the 2015 Pan American Games
Pan American Games competitors for Barbados